Glenelg Golf Club is a private golf club located in the Adelaide suburb of Novar Gardens, also near the seaside suburb of Glenelg. It is located adjacent the southern boundary of Adelaide International Airport and within easy access of the Adelaide CBD.

In January 2016 the course was ranked 25th among the top 100 Australian courses by Golf Australia Magazine.

The 18-hole golf course is a par 71 and measures 6,267 metres. It possesses couch grass fairways, bent grass greens, and revetted-edge style bunkering. It is reminiscent of the traditional Scottish links courses.

Glenelg has played host to numerous state and national championships, including the South Australian Open. It also hosted the 1986 Australian Amateur and co-hosted qualifying for the 2004 Australian Amateur with Royal Adelaide Golf Club.

Course scorecard

Tournaments hosted 

 2004 Australian Amateur qualifying (with Royal Adelaide Golf Club)
 1986 Australian Amateur
 1981 South Australian Open
 1979 South Australian Open
 1978 South Australian Open
 1974 South Australian Open
 1970 South Australian Open
 1967 South Australian Open
 1963 South Australian Open

References

External links 
 Official Glenelg Golf Club website
 Golf Australia Website - Australian Men's Amateur Championship Past Results
 TA Golf - Jacob's Creek Open Event History

Sports venues in Adelaide
Sporting clubs in Adelaide
Golf clubs and courses in South Australia
Sports venues completed in 1927
1927 establishments in Australia